Mr. Magorium's Wonder Emporium is a 2007 novelization of the film of the same name.  The novelization was written by American fantasy author Suzanne Weyn. The novel, or "Magical Movie Novel", as it is named on its cover, was released on October 1, 2007. The film was written and directed by Zach Helm.

Plot introduction
When a young pianist named Molly Mahoney inherits a magical toy store from her eccentric 243-year-old boss, Mr. Magorium, she struggles with self-doubt. But through the friendship of a charismatic little boy named Eric Applebaum and a buttoned-up accountant named Henry Weston, she learns to believe in herself, and finds that she does possess enough magic to run Mr. Magorium's shop by finding herself in places she's never imagined.

External links
Official site
Walden Media
Scholastic Books

2007 British novels
2007 children's books
British children's novels
Children's fantasy novels
British fantasy novels
Novels based on films
Scholastic Corporation books

ca:Mr. Magorium i la seva botiga màgica